Dafydd Gruffydd (1911–1982) was a Welsh television producer and television director. He made a number of literary adaptations for BBC Wales including How Green Was My Valley (1960) and The House Under the Water (1961).

References

Bibliography 
 Geraint Evans & Helen Fulton. The Cambridge History of Welsh Literature. Cambridge University Press, 2019.

External links 
 

1911 births
1982 deaths
British television producers
British television directors
Mass media people from Cardiff
20th-century British businesspeople